3rd Infantry Regiment, later known as the 3rd Infantry Regiment of the Lithuanian Grand Duke Vytautas () was a Lithuanian Army infantry regiment that saw combat in the Lithuanian Wars of Independence. It existed from 1919 to 1926 and from 1935 to 1940.

Formation 
The regiment began forming on 4 May 1919. In Raseiniai, the regiment was formed on the basis of the Šauliai Battalion under the guidance of the commander of the 1st Brigade Pranas Liatukas. On 26 February 1920, the regiment was given the name of the Grand Duke of Lithuania Vytautas.

Lithuanian Wars of Independence 
Since August 1919, the regiment fought against the Bolsheviks near Daugpilis.

In 1920, the regiment defended Lithuania against the invading Polish forces near Suvalkai, Kalvarija, distinguishing itself in the battles near Varėna, Lentvaris, Vievis. Thereafter, the 3rd Regiment guarded the demarcation line Vievis–Dubingiai–Zarasai.

Interwar 
On 1 October 1926, the regiment was disbanded, but it was reformed in 1935. The regiment's HQ was in Kėdainiai, and the regiments garrisoned Raseiniai and Seredžius.

When Soviet Union occupied Lithuania, the 3rd Regiment was disbanded. Most of the men were reassigned to the 256th Rifle Regiment of the Red Army.

Commanders 
 1919 officer Pranas Liatukas
 1919 officer Ignas Musteikis
 1920 Major Jonas Gricius
 1922–1924 Major Aleksandras Jakaitis
 1925–1926 Colonel Vincas Šaudzis
 1935–1939 Staff colonel Viktoras Giedrys
 1939–1940 Colonel Petras Genys

References 

 http://www.archyvai.lt/lt/fondai/kariuomene/lcva_f516.html
 

Military units and formations established in 1919
Military units and formations disestablished in 1940
Infantry regiments of Lithuania